The 1913 U.S. National Championships (now known as the US Open) took place on the outdoor grass courts at the Newport Casino in Newport, United States. The men's singles tournament ran from 18 August until 26 August while the women's singles and doubles championship took place from 9 June to 14 June at the Philadelphia Cricket Club in Chestnut Hill. It was the 33rd staging of the U.S. National Championships, and the second Grand Slam tennis event of the year. Future seven-time singles champion Bill Tilden won his first U.S. Championship title, partnering Mary Browne in the mixed doubles.

Finals

Men's singles

 Maurice McLoughlin defeated  R. Norris Williams  6–4, 5–7, 6–3, 6–1

Women's singles

 Mary Browne defeated  Dorothy Green  6–2, 7–5

Men's doubles
 Maurice McLoughlin /  Tom Bundy defeated  John Strachan /  Clarence Griffin 6–4, 7–5, 6–1

Women's doubles
 Mary Browne /  Louise Riddell Williams defeated  Dorothy Green /  Edna Wildey 12–10, 2–6, 6–3

Mixed doubles
 Mary Browne /  Bill Tilden defeated  Dorothy Green /  C. S. Rogers 7–5, 7–5

References

External links
Official US Open website

 
U.S. National Championships
U.S. National Championships (tennis) by year
U.S. National Championships (tennis)
U.S. National Championships (tennis)
U.S. National Championships (tennis)
U.S. National Championships (tennis)
U.S. National Championships (tennis)